Larry Gene Bell (October 30, 1949 – October 4, 1996) was an American murderer and suspected serial killer in Lexington County, South Carolina, who was electrocuted for the murders of Sharon Faye "Shari" Smith and Debra May Helmick. Bell forced Smith to write a "Last Will and Testament" before he murdered her and taunted her family by telephone.

Background
Larry Gene Bell was born in Ralph, Alabama and had three sisters and one brother. The family reportedly moved frequently. Bell attended Eau Claire High School in Columbia, South Carolina from 1965 to 1967. The Bells moved to Mississippi, where Larry Gene Bell graduated high school and trained as an electrician. He returned to Columbia, married, and had one son.

Bell joined the United States Marine Corps in 1970 but was discharged the same year due to a knee injury suffered when he accidentally shot himself when cleaning a gun. The following year, he worked as a correctional officer at the Department of Corrections in Columbia for one month. Bell and his family moved to Rock Hill, South Carolina in 1972, and the couple divorced in 1976.

Victims
Bell kidnapped 17-year-old Sharon Faye "Shari" Smith at gunpoint from the end of her driveway on Platt Springs Road in Lexington County, South Carolina around 3:38 p.m. on May 31, 1985 while she was collecting mail from the mailbox. Her car was found abandoned at the curb near the mailbox. Shari's parents, Bob and Hilda Smith immediately contacted the Lexington Sheriff's Department to report their daughter missing. Two days after Shari's kidnapping, the Smith family received a phone call from her abductor, Bell. Bell called in a distorted voice from a payphone 20 miles from the Smith home in Columbia. Over the next few days, Bell called the Smith family regularly from a payphone to tell them Shari was fine and to taunt them. In fact, Shari likely was killed within twelve hours of her abduction. 

He told the family to expect a letter in the mail the following day with more information about their missing daughter. The letter, which was two pages in length and written on paper from a yellow legal pad, was in Shari's handwriting. Across the top she had written, "Last Will and Testament". Several times throughout the letter, Shari emphasized to her family how much she loved them. She wrote that they should never let her kidnapping ruin their lives. She also requested that she have a closed casket at her funeral. Six days after her disappearance, Bell called the Smith family and provided specific directions to follow which led to Shari's remains. Her body was found behind an old Masonic Lodge in Saluda County, 18 miles west of the Smith home. The autopsy showed that Shari had been dead for about four days. Authorities were unable to determine her cause of death, but a residue of duct tape on Shari’s face suggested she had died of suffocation by having had duct tape wrapped around her face.

Two weeks after Shari was kidnapped from outside her home, on June 14, Bell kidnapped 9-year-old Debra May Helmick from her front yard near her family's trailer on Old Percival Road in Richland County, 24 miles from the Smith home. He killed her, and again called the Smith family after midnight on June 23, to tell them where he had left Helmick's body just off a dirt road, amongst thick brush. Debra was also suffocated to death with duct tape around her face.

Bell was also a suspect in two other disappearances: the 1984 disappearance of Sandee Elaine Cornett, and the 1975 disappearance of Denise Newsom Porch. On November 18, 1984, Sandee Cornett, then aged 26, was last seen arriving home from supper with her fiancé at 6:30 p.m. Later that evening, her fiancé attempted to reach her on the phone but received no response as he drove back to his house in Greenville, South Carolina. The following day, when she failed to show up for work, her neighbor reported her missing. There were no indications of a break-in or struggle at her house. Her checkbook, house keys, and driver's licence were all close, and the brown pocketbook was on her bed with the TV on. There were only three items missing: an ATM card, a dictaphone, and a dark blue Velour jogging suit (probably worn by Sandee). Because she "was not the sort to open her door to a stranger", investigators think she was taken away in her home by someone she knew. Authorities spent two days looking for Sandee in the neighborhoods and neighboring woods, but they were unsuccessful. The lost ATM card was located and used twice at an unidentified Charlotte bank. Employees remembered seeing a woman who was not Sandee use it twice and a man use it once. The main suspect in Sandee's disappearance is Larry Gene Bell. Bell was reportedly her previous boyfriend's co-worker at Charlotte's Douglas International Airport and had attended a party at her home, despite the neighbors' denials of seeing the two go out together or him at her house. He denied abducting and killing her but made statements, including drawing a map, that suggested where her body was buried.

21-year-old Denise Porch was last observed in Charlotte, North Carolina on July 31, 1975. She lived in the complex at the time and worked as the manager of Yorktown Apartments on Tyvola Road. She informed her spouse in a note that she was leaving to show an apartment to a potential tenant. She was last observed showing a man about the property in the late afternoon. She was never again seen. Inside her own apartment, there were no indications of a scuffle, and the television and air conditioning were both left on. Porch abandoned everything, including her purse and Camaro, when she left. Only a list of open apartments that she would show potential tenants and the keys to the complex's vacant flats remained. She was never again seen. No information regarding her whereabouts was found despite a thorough investigation. Seven years after her disappearance, in 1982, her family had her proclaimed legally dead. Since she had recently celebrated her first wedding anniversary and, according to her relatives, was content with her life at the time of her disappearance, it is unlikely that Porch left on her own volition. In the middle of the 1980s, Larry Gene Bell became a potential suspect in the Porch investigation. He was a former electrician who, in 1975, resided around 300 yards away from Yorktown Apartments on Cherrycrest Lane. He maintained his innocence in Porch's case and was never formally charged in connection with her disappearance. He is also the prime suspect in several other young women's disappearances and presumed murders in North Carolina. Porch physically resembled Bell's other victims and authorities believe he was involved in her case. Both Porch and Cornett vanished in Charlotte, North Carolina, and remain classified as missing.

Arrest and trial
During the largest manhunt in South Carolina history, Bell made eight telephone calls to the Smith family, often speaking with Shari's sister Dawn. During one of his phone calls with Dawn, he accidentally let it slip that, "All I wanted to do was make love with Dawn," instead of "All I wanted to do was make love with Shari." Dawn and Shari had a striking resemblance, and so it is thought he mistook Shari for Dawn. Bell's fixation on Dawn only grew as time passed, and made many more calls. During one, Bell eventually gave exact directions to the locations of both of the bodies and described to the family how he had killed Smith.

On June 27, Bell was arrested after forensics was able to find indentations of an incomplete phone number on the stationery of the letter that was sent to Smith's family. Filling in the missing digits led the FBI to a couple who hired Bell for some work and had him house sit for them while they were away. Six hairs "microscopically similar" to Shari Smith's hair were found in Bell's apartment. 

During his six-hour testimony at his trial, Bell continuously blurted out bizarre comments and carried on nonstop theatrics, rambling continuously and refusing to answer questions. He later made statements indicating that he may have been attempting to fake mental illness in order to receive a more lenient sentence. He claimed to be Jesus Christ until his death.

Execution
Bell chose to die by the electric chair instead of lethal injection. Larry Gene Bell was electrocuted to death on October 4, 1996, at the age of 46. He had no final words. Bell was the last death row inmate in South Carolina executed by electrocution until James Neil Tucker was executed in 2004 for the double murders of Rosa Lee Dolly Oakley and Shannon Lynn Mellon.

Media

Docudrama
 The television movie Nightmare in Columbia County, also known as Victim of Beauty: The Dawn Smith Story, aired December 10, 1991. The movie portrayed the events of the Shari Smith murder with a focus on the involvement of Shari's sister Dawn in the case.
 Investigation Discovery's I, Witness, titled "The Smith Sisters", season 1, episode 2, aired on January 4, 2017. This 42-minute docudrama reflects the story from the victim's sister's (Dawn Smith) perspective.

Documentaries
 Investigation Discovery's Murder Calls ("The Devil's Voice"; Season 3, Episode 6), aired May 24, 2018.
 TruTV's Forensic Files, "Last Will", season 7, episode 42, aired July 26, 2003.
 Investigation Discovery's On the Case with Paula Zahn titled "One Month of Terror", season 7, episode 10, aired February 24, 2013.

Other

A year after Shari Smith's death, her sister, Dawn Elizabeth Smith, was crowned Miss South Carolina (1986). Now known as Dawn Smith Jordan, she became a Christian singer/songwriter and wrote a book, Grace So Amazing: A True Story of God's Grace in the Midst of Life-Shattering Tragedy, about her family's story throughout the ordeal and recorded the song "Sisters". 

Murder in the Midlands: Larry Gene Bell and the 28 Days of Terror that Shook South Carolina was written about Bell's killing spree. 

Audio pertaining to the murders was sampled on the album Hide the Kitchen Knives by The Paper Chase. 

A detailed account of the efforts to create and apply an FBI profile of the then-unknown murderer of Sharon Smith and Debra Helmick appears as a chapter in Mindhunter: Inside the FBI'S Elite Serial Crime Unit, a memoir of former special agent John E. Douglas. 

The tragedy was also the subject of the Court TV show The FBI Files, season 2, episode 3, titled "Cat and Mouse". which aired October 5, 1999.

The true crime podcast Crime Junkie released an episode about the murders on August 15, 2022.

See also
 Capital punishment in South Carolina
 Capital punishment in the United States
 List of people executed in South Carolina

Notes

References

External links
 US Executions since 1976, Clark County Prosecutor; retrieved August 17, 2007.
 Nightmare in Columbia County (1991), imdb.com; accessed July 7, 2020.

1949 births
1985 murders in the United States
1996 deaths
20th-century criminals
20th-century executions by South Carolina
20th-century executions of American people
American murderers of children
American people executed for murder
Executed people from Alabama
People convicted of murder by South Carolina
People executed by South Carolina by electric chair
People from Tuscaloosa County, Alabama
Suspected serial killers